Narayanpur is a village in Agiaon block, Bhojpur district of Bihar, India. As of 2011, its population was 6,476 in 961 households.

See also
Arrah Lok Sabha constituency
Agiaon Assembly constituency

References

Villages in Bhojpur district, India